This is a list of hotels in Europe that have 1,000 or more guest accommodation rooms. Since 1980, the largest hotel in Europe is the Izmailovo Hotel in Moscow, Russia with 5,000 rooms divided between four buildings.

Largest hotels in Europe

See also

 List of largest hotels
 List of tallest hotels
 Rossiya Hotel

Notes

References

Largest
Hotels
Hotels